The anterior hypothalamic nucleus is a nucleus of the hypothalamus. 

Its function is thermoregulation (cooling) of the body. Damage or destruction of this nucleus causes hyperthermia.

The anterior hypothalamus plays a role in regulating sleep.

The anterior hypothalamic region is sometimes grouped with the preoptic area.

References

External links
 NIF Search - Anterior nucleus of hypothalamus via the Neuroscience Information Framework

Hypothalamus